The Springsteen and E Street Band 2023 Tour is an ongoing concert tour by American singer Bruce Springsteen and his backing band the E Street Band. The tour began on February 1, 2023, in Tampa, and marks the first time since 2017 that Springsteen and the E Street Band have toured together. The tour is scheduled to conclude on December 10, 2023, in San Francisco.

Background 
In 2019, following two years of performing solo shows on Broadway, Springsteen announced that he would go on tour with the E Street Band in 2020. The tour would have been in support of his 2020 album, Letter to You. Due to the COVID-19 pandemic, however, touring was put on hold until 2021. In January 2021, Springsteen again announced that, due to the ongoing pandemic, he would not tour with the E Street Band in 2021. Later that year, however, he returned to Broadway for more solo shows. 

On May 23, 2022, an upcoming tour was initially hinted with a short teaser displayed through Springsteen's social media accounts; the full announcement came the next day on his webpage. 
The tour commenced with dates in the U.S., starting in February 2023, and will then visit Europe. The tour is then scheduled to revisit North America starting from August 2023.

COVID-19 absences and postponed shows 
Early in the tour, the band was impacted by positive COVID-19 tests. Soozie Tyrell missed the shows in Hollywood and Dallas, marking the first time she missed a concert since joining the band in 2002. Guitarist Steven Van Zandt was also absent from the Dallas concert. On February 13, 2023, it was announced that guitarist Nils Lofgren had tested positive, and he was absent from the February 14th show in Houston. It was the first show Lofgren had missed since joining the E Street Band in 1984. Van Zandt and Tyrell returned to the tour in Houston. Lofgren returned to the tour on February 16 in Austin, but Jake Clemons missed the show, along with the February 18 show in Kansas City, due to testing positive. The March 9, 12, and 14 shows were postponed due to an undisclosed illness in the band. The shows were rescheduled for later dates in September and the tour resumed on March 16.

Ticket price backlash 
Springsteen decided to use Ticketmaster's Verified Fan service for a majority of his North America tour dates to try and eliminate scalpers and bots on the secondary market from buying up tickets and selling them at much higher prices, a problem many of his previous tours have faced. Fans would need to be verified and sent a code, which they would receive in a text message the night before the on-sale date, for the show or shows they planned to attend. Not all fans were guaranteed to receive a code, however; some were placed on a waitlist. Tickets would go on sale at 10 am and once the Verified Fan window for ticket sales ended, which was normally at 3 pm, the remaining tickets would be released to the general public. The first tickets for the U.S. dates went on sale on July 20, 2022, and fans were instantly met with very high ticket prices, such as $4,000–5,000 for mid-range floor seats, and into the four figures for other, less desirable tickets. This was called Ticketmaster's "dynamic pricing" program, in which "platinum tickets", which may be placed anywhere in the arena, from the front section to the back rows, fluctuate in price, in what is said to be ongoing reaction to demand. Some fans were able to buy tickets at face value as they went on sale; however, within minutes of tickets going on sale, the dynamic pricing kicked in and the tickets changed to the platinum tickets or were only available through the secondary market via Ticketmaster's resale program at much higher prices. Complaints from outraged fans flooded social media and Springsteen-related message boards demanding that Springsteen and his management release a statement in response to this. Guitarist Steven Van Zandt has been the only member of the E Street Band to respond to the situation when he was asked about it on Twitter. He said, “I have nothing whatsoever to do with the price of tickets. Nothing. Nada. Niente. Bubkis. Dick”. New Jersey congressman Bill Pascrell Jr., who has been a staunch ticket-industry critic, called out Ticketmaster for instituting a "market-based" pricing system that allows ticket costs to rise and fall based on demand. "When Yogi Berra said it's 'déjà vu all over again,' he could have easily been talking about Ticketmaster and another unwelcome surprise for Springsteen fans. After the long hiatus, we are all excited that Bruce is going back in tour. But Americans have the right to enjoy some live entertainment without getting ripped off. Ticketmaster sees popular events as an opportunity to soak regular Americans", the lawmaker said in a statement. 

Tickets for Springsteen's shows in the UK sold out in under 8 hours, but many UK fans took to social media complaining about the same issues fans in the U.S. faced.

On July 24, 2022, Ticketmaster issued a response defending their controversial "dynamic pricing" plan, saying that 88.2% of tickets were sold at fixed prices that ranged from $59.50 to $399 before added service fees and that the average price of all tickets sold so far is $262, with 56% being sold for under $200 face value. Ticketmaster did not dispute reports of tickets being priced through the platinum program for as high as $4–5,000. Ticketmaster is claiming that only 1.3% of total tickets so far have gone for more than $1,000. Ticketmaster further broke down the percentages on the 56% of tickets it says were sold for under $200. It said that 18% were sold under $99, 27% went for between $100–$150, and 11% sold for between $150–$200. "Prices and formats are consistent with industry standards for top performers," the company said in their statement.

On July 26, 2022, six days after tickets went on sale in North America, Springsteen's manager Jon Landau issued a statement to The New York Times defending the price of tickets, saying, "In pricing tickets for this tour, we looked carefully at what our peers have been doing. We chose prices that are lower than some and on par with others. Regardless of the commentary about a modest number of tickets costing $1,000 or more, our true average ticket price has been in the mid-$200 range. I believe that in today's environment, that is a fair price to see someone universally regarded as among the very greatest artists of his generation."

Recordings
On December 15, 2022, it was announced that all shows of the tour would be recorded and mixed and available within days.

Set list
This was the set list for the first concert of the tour and for the most part has been representative of the average setlist of the tour's first North American leg. This tour has seen the live debut of songs from Springsteen's 2020 album, Letter to You, and the first live performances with the E Street Band of songs from his 2022 album, Only the Strong Survive.

 "No Surrender"
 "Ghosts"
 "Prove It All Night"
 "Letter to You"
 "The Promised Land"
 "Out in the Street"
 "Candy's Room"
 "Kitty's Back"
 "Brilliant Disguise"
 "Nighshift"
 "Don't Play That Song (You Lied)"
 "The E Street Shuffle"
 "Johnny 99"
 "Last Man Standing" (solo acoustic)
 "House of a Thousand Guitars"
 "Backstreets"
 "Because the Night"
 "She's the One"
 "Wrecking Ball"
 "The Rising"
 "Badlands"
Encore
 "Burnin' Train"
 "Born to Run"
 "Rosalita (Come Out Tonight)"
 "Glory Days"
 "Dancing in the Dark"
 "Tenth Avenue Freeze-Out"
 "I'll See You in My Dreams" (solo acoustic)

Other songs performed and alternated into the set list: "Thunder Road", "Darlington County", "Mansion on the Hill", "Ramrod", "Detroit Medley", "Night", "If I Was the Priest" (performed for the first time since 1972 and first time with the E Street Band), "Cadillac Ranch", "Land of Hope and Dreams", "Trapped", "I'm on Fire", "Bobby Jean", "Working on the Highway", "Death to My Hometown", "Hungry Heart", and "Pay Me My Money Down" (performed for the first time since 2014 with the E Street Band).

Shows

Postponed dates

Notes

Personnel

The E Street Band
Bruce Springsteen – lead vocals, lead guitar, rhythm guitar, acoustic guitar, harmonica
Roy Bittan – piano, synthesizer, accordion
Nils Lofgren – rhythm guitar, lead guitar, pedal steel guitar, acoustic guitar, background vocals 
Patti Scialfa – Background vocals, some duet vocals, acoustic guitar, tambourine (only appearing at selected shows throughout the tour)
Garry Tallent – bass guitar, background vocals
Steven Van Zandt – rhythm guitar, lead guitar, background vocals 
Max Weinberg – drums

and

Jake Clemons – saxophone, percussion, background vocals 
Soozie Tyrell – violin, acoustic guitar, percussion, background vocals
Charles Giordano – organ, accordion, electronic glockenspiel

with

Ed Manion – tenor saxophone, baritone saxophone, percussion
Ozzie Melendez – trombone, percussion
Curt Ramm – trumpet, percussion
Barry Danielian – trumpet, percussion
Anthony Almonte – percussion, congas, bongos, backing vocals
Curtis King Jr. – backing vocals, percussion
Lisa Lowell – backing vocals, percussion
Michelle Moore – backing vocals, percussion
Ada Dyer – backing vocals, percussion
Source:

References

2023 concert tours
Bruce Springsteen concert tours